Luiza Galiulina (born 23 June 1992 in Tashkent) is an Uzbek gymnast. She was banned from elite international competition for 2 years after testing positive for furosemide during the London 2012 Olympics. Her ban ended August 1, 2014. She is an ethnic Tatar and currently lives in Belarus.

2008 Summer Olympics

Artistic Gymnastics

Women

2010 Asian Games

2012 Summer Olympics
Galiulina was Uzbekistan's only artistic gymnast at the 2012 Summer Olympics. She was initially suspended and later excluded from the games after testing positive for the banned diuretic drug furosemide.

See also
 List of Olympic female artistic gymnasts for Uzbekistan

References

1992 births
Living people
Sportspeople from Tashkent
Uzbekistani female artistic gymnasts
Olympic gymnasts of Uzbekistan
Gymnasts at the 2008 Summer Olympics
Uzbekistani people of Tatar descent
Asian Games medalists in gymnastics
Gymnasts at the 2010 Asian Games
Doping cases in gymnastics
Asian Games bronze medalists for Uzbekistan
Medalists at the 2010 Asian Games
Tatar sportspeople
21st-century Uzbekistani women